The Refunding Certificate was a type of interest-bearing banknote that the United States Treasury issued in 1879. They issued it only in the $10 denomination, depicting Benjamin Franklin.  Their issuance reflects the end of a coin-hoarding period that began during the American Civil War, and represented a return to public confidence in paper money.

When the Treasury issued the bonds, silver coins were in wide circulation and gold coins were just beginning to appear at banks nationwide. The Treasury paid out  in notes, the majority— (or 98.5%)—in the fourth quarter of 1879, as long lines of people gathered at Post Office branches and Treasury offices.  The Refunding Certificate originally promised to pay 4% annual interest in perpetuity.  The obligation on these notes reads:

Or multiples thereof."

By January 1, 1885, all but  (99.4%) in face value had been redeemed, and since that time most others have met the same fate.

Consistent with the Treasury Department paper used in printing the Fourth and Fifth Issues of Fractional currency (1869–76), anti-counterfeiting devices of the period included embedding large silk fibers as well as the use of blue tinted paper.

Only a few 1879 Refunding Certificates were imprinted with the inscription Payable to Order. Only two are known to still exist.  Most were inscribed Payable to Bearer and even these are rare—only a few dozen are in numismatic collections.

Footnotes

References

Standard Catalog of United States Paper Money 17th edition published by Krause Publications
Official 2006 Blackbook Price Guide to United States Paper Money (38th edition)
The Official RED BOOK A Guide Book of United States Paper Money
 Harry Bass Foundation

Paper money of the United States
Works about Benjamin Franklin